Munʿim Khān was a Mughal general under both emperors Humayun and Akbar. He was titled Khān-i-Khānān ('Khan of Khans') when Emperor Akbar appointed him as Prime Minister of the Mughal Empire in 1560. In 1564, he became the Subahdar of Jaunpur. Munim Khan was the first Mughal governor of Bengal Subah from 1574 to 1575.

Early life and family
Khan was a Persianised Turk whose ancestors originally hailed from the city of Andijan in present-day Uzbekistan. His father's name was Miran Beg Andijani, and his foster brother was Mirza Askari.

Career
In 1560, Bairam Khan retired from his role as the Empire's Vakil (prime minister) and Mughal emperor Akbar then appointed Munim for this role. Under Akbar's orders, Munim went into war with Mah Chuchak Begum who had transgressed but was defeated by her in Jalalabad and Munim's son, Ghani Khan, was executed. After the Uzbeks of Jaunpur rebelled, Munim Khan was tasked as the Governor of Jaunpur and the eastern districts. Khan was promoted to a Mansabdar (military commander) of 5000 soldiers, which was the highest rank at the time.

Expeditions against Daud Khan Karrani

Akbar sent Khan to suppress the independent Sultan of Bengal, Daud Khan Karrani, who had refused to recognise the Mughal Empire. After initially failing, Munim Khan successfully took control of Hajipur and Patna. Khan was then appointed as the Subahdar (governor) of Bengal (which included Bihar at the time). He later captured the erstwhile capital of Bengal, Khwaspur Tandah, on 25 September 1574. During the Battle of Tukaroi, held on 3 March 1575, Munim Khan forced Daud Karrani to sign a treaty which left only Odisha under Daud's control. Munim Khan then transferred Bengal's capital from Tanda to Gaur.

Personal life
Munim Khan had 8 concubines, and was the father of two children:
 Ghani Khan - executed in Kabul at the orders of Empress Mah Chuchak Begum.
 Sahila Banu Begum - married to Emperor Jahangir in 1607

Death
Munim died on 23 October 1575 in Tanda after fleeing an epidemic plague at Gaur. After his death, Daud Khan Karrani re-captured Gaur.

See also
List of rulers of Bengal
History of Bengal
History of India

References

External link

1575 deaths
Subahdars of Bengal
Subahdars of Bihar
1525 births
16th-century Indian people
Mughal generals
16th-century Turkic people
People from Andijan Region